Ischalis variabilis, also known as oblique-waved fern looper, is a species of moth in the family Geometridae first described by William Warren in 1895. It is endemic to New Zealand, where it is widespread in the North and South islands.

Description 
There are two to three distinct transverse lines on the forewing. Both sexes have four discal spots which are usually visible dorsally as well as ventrally. Adults have been recorded year round, except June on the North Island. The main flight period is September to March. There seem to be two generations per year, but may breed continuously during mild winters. The adult moths can be collected by beating the skirt of the dead fronds of their host species. 

The eggs are usually deposited in January and February. They are almost hemispherical, slightly ovate, flattened, pale bluish-green in colour, covered with numerous very slight hexagonal depressions. As the enclosed embryo develops, small irregular reddish-brown patches appear on the surface of the egg-shell.

Host species 
The larvae have been recorded feeding on Cyathea and Dicksonia species including Cyathea smithii, Cyathea dealbata and Dicksonia squarrosa. First-instar larvae are very pale ochreous brown, with two wavy orange-red subdorsal lines. Full-grown larvae are about 32 mm long and pale rusty brown with an obscure pale-brown dorsal line. The larvae feed at night. Pupation takes place in a pupa enclosed in a curled fern leaf or hidden amongst leaf litter on the ground.

References

Lithinini
Moths of New Zealand
Moths described in 1909
Endemic fauna of New Zealand
Taxa named by William Warren (entomologist)
Endemic moths of New Zealand